The 2022 Sud Ladies Cup (officially ) was the third edition of the Sud Ladies Cup women's football tournament.

It was held in the department of Bouches-du-Rhône from 22 to 28 June 2022. In this season, the tournament was contested by under-20 national teams. The invited teams qualified for the 2022 FIFA U-20 Women's World Cup to be held in Costa Rica from 10 to 28 August 2022. The last champions North Korea were not invited to the 2022 tournament.

United States won their second title after beat France and Mexico and draw with Netherlands.

Participants
Four participating teams were announced on 10 June 2022.

CONCACAF
 (2nd participation)
 (2nd participation)

UEFA
 (3rd participation)
 (1st participation)

Squads

Venues
The matches were played in Aubagne.

Match officials
The referees were:

Format
The four invited teams played a round-robin tournament. The teams were ranked according to points (3 points for a win, 1 point for a draw, and 0 points for a loss). In the event of a draw, the two teams faced each other in a penalty shoot-out, with a bonus point for the winners. If tied on points, head-to-head match would be used to determine the ranking.

Results

Statistics

Goalscorers

Awards
After the final, the following players were rewarded for their performances during the competition.

Best player:  Laurina Fazer
Best goalkeeper:  Mia Justus
Topscorer:  Trinity Byars

Sud Ladies Cup 2022 best XI
The best XI team was a squad consisting of the eleven most impressive players at the tournament.

See also
2022 Toulon Tournament

References

External links 
 Sud Ladies Cup

2022 in women's association football
2022 in youth association football
2021–22 in French football
June 2022 sports events in France
Sud Ladies Cup